Universiti Tun Abdul Razak (UNIRAZAK) is a premier private university in Kuala Lumpur. The university was established on 18 December 1997 and is one of the earliest private universities in Malaysia, widely known as Kuala Lumpur's Premier School of Business & Government.

UNIRAZAK offers undergraduate and postgraduate programs in various fields such as Business, Law, Education, Information Technology, and more. They also offer Executive Education and Professional Development courses.

Establishment 

Founded in 1997,  as one of the first Private Higher Educational Institutions in the country, the university collaborates with numerous Independent Regional Centres across the country with a population of more than 9,000 students in 60 academic programmes. The university prides itself in developing outstanding programmes to meet the needs and aspirations of in its diverse and highly talented student body.

Transportation access

UNIRAZAK campus is accessible by car and the LRT Kelana Jaya Line (Line 5) of the Klang Valley Integrated Transit System. The campus can be accessed from the LRT Kelana Jaya line by alighting from  Ampang Park station, which is about a 5-minute walk from the campus entrance.

Future connecting station for the  MRT

Faculties and centres
Centre for Foundation Studies (CFS) 
Bank Rakyat School of Business, Innovation, Technology & Entrepreneurship (BRSBITE)
School of Accounting & Taxation (SAT)
Centre of Excellence for Professional Accounting & Taxation (CEPAT)
Tun Ahmad Sarji School of Government & Public Services (TASSGPS) (formerly known as Tun Abdul Razak School of Government (TARSOG))
School of Education & Humanities (SEH)
Graduate School of Business (GSB)

Programmes offered

Centre for Foundation Studies (CFS) 
Foundation in Arts (formerly known as Foundation in Arts and Social Science)

Bank Rakyat School of Business, Innovation, Technology & Entrepreneurship (BRSBITE) 

 Diploma in Management

 Diploma in Sports Management 
 Diploma in Information Technology
 Advanced Diploma in Management
 Bachelor of Business Administration (Honours)
 Bachelor of Business Administration (Islamic Financial Planning) (Honours) 
 Bachelor of Business Administration  (Islamic Banking and Finance) (Honours) 
 Bachelor of Business Management (Entrepreneurship) (Honours) 
 Bachelor of Business Administration (Insurance) (Honours)
 Bachelor of Management (Honours)
 Bachelor of Information Technology (Honours)
 Bachelor of Business (Honours) in Business Analytics and Digital Marketing

School of Accounting & Taxation (SAT) 

 Diploma in Accounting
 Advanced Diploma in Accounting 
 Bachelor in Taxation (Honours)  [Formerly known as Bachelor of Taxation (Honours)]
 Bachelor of Accounting (Honours) 
 Bachelor in Accounting (Honours)

Centre of Excellence for Professional Accounting & Taxation (CEPAT) 

 ACCA Foundation in Accountancy

 ACCA Qualification

Tun Ahmad Sarji School of Government & Public Services (TASSGPS) (formerly known as Tun Abdul Razak School of Government (TARSOG)) 

 Diploma in Social Work
 Bachelor of Arts (Leadership) (Honours)
 Bachelor of Arts in Governance and Public Policy  (Honours)  [formerly known as Bachelor of Arts (Government and Public Policy) (Honours)]
 Bachelor of Economics (Honours)
 Master of Public Policy
 Bachelor of Arts in Public Management (Honours)
 Master in Public Management

School of Education & Humanities (SEH) 

 Diploma in Early Childhood Education
 Diploma in Psychology
 Bachelor of Education (Early Childhood Education) (Honours)
 Bachelor of Education (Honours)
 Bachelor of English (Honours)
 Bachelor of Psychology (Honours)
 Postgraduate Certificate in Education
 Postgraduate Diploma in Education
 Master of Education (Teaching English as a Second Language)
 Master in Early Childhood Education 
 Master of Education
 Doctor of Philosophy in Education

Graduate School of Business (GSB) 

 Doctor of Philosophy [Formerly known as Doctor of Philosophy (Management) by Research]
 Master of Business Administration (Leadership)
 Master of Business Administration (Services Management)
 Master in Strategic Human Resource Management (MSHRM)
 Master of Philosophy (MPhil) 
 [formerly known as Master of Science (Management) by Research]
 Master of Business Administration 
 Master of Business Administration (Global Islamic Finance)
 Master of Business Administration (Retail and Hypermarket)
 Master in Management (formerly known as Master of Management)

References

Private universities and colleges in Malaysia
Universities and colleges in Kuala Lumpur
Educational institutions established in 1997
1997 establishments in Malaysia